Jan Steadman (born 3 November 1947) is a Trinidadian former footballer who played at both professional and international levels as a defender.

Career
Steadman spent two seasons with the New York Generals, and one season with the New York Cosmos, making a total of 29 appearances.

He also spent time with the Trinidad and Tobago national side, appearing in three FIFA World Cup qualifying matches.

References

1947 births
Living people
Trinidad and Tobago footballers
Trinidad and Tobago international footballers
National Professional Soccer League (1967) players
New York Generals (NPSL) players
North American Soccer League (1968–1984) players
New York Generals players
New York Cosmos players
Association football defenders